Pentatomidae is a family of insects belonging to the order Hemiptera, generally called shield bugs or stink bugs. Pentatomidae is the largest family in the superfamily Pentatomoidea, and contains around 900 genera and over 4700 species. As hemipterans, the pentatomids have piercing sucking mouthparts, and most are phytophagous, including several species which are severe pests on agricultural crops. However, some species, particularly in the subfamily Asopinae, are predatory and may be considered beneficial.

Etymology
The name "Pentatomidae" is from the Greek pente meaning "five" and tomos meaning  "section", and refers to the five segments of their antennae. Pentatomids are generally called "shield bugs" in British English, or "stink bugs" in American English. However, the term shield bugs is also applied broadly to include several related families (e.g. Acanthosomatidae, Scutelleridae, and Cydnidae), or specifically only to refer to species in the family Acanthosomatidae. The term shield bug refers to the generalized body shape of adult bugs in these families which resembles a heraldic shield when viewed from above.

The American name "stink bug" is specific to the Pentatomidae, and refers to their ability to release a pungent defensive spray when threatened, disturbed, or crushed. The composition of this spray may vary between species, and even by sex or age, but generally includes aldehydes and alkanes. Descriptions of the smells vary widely, and include oily, dusty, woody and earthy, and like coriander. In some species, the liquid contains cyanide compounds and a rancid almond scent, used to protect themselves and discourage predators.

The term "stink bug" may also be a vernacular for unrelated insects such as pinacate beetles (in the genus Eleodes).

Taxonomy
There are several subfamilies, of which the Aphylinae is often given family status, but is here retained as a subfamily, following Grazia et al. (2008).  The subfamilies include:
 Aphylinae Bergroth, 1906 – Australia
 Aphylus Bergroth, 1906
 Neoaphylum Štys & Davidová-Vilímová, 2001
Asopinae Spinola, 1850
 Troilus Stål, 1868
Cyrtocorinae Distant, 1880
 Ceratozygum Horváth, 1916
 Cyphothyrea Horváth, 1916
 Cyrtocoris White, 1842
 Pseudocyrtocoris Jensen-Haarup, 1926
Discocephalinae Fieber, 1860
 Discocephala Laporte, 1832
 Ochlerus Spinola, 1837
Edessinae Fieber, 1860

 Anisoedessa Nunes & Fernandes, 2019
 Brachystethus Laporte, 1833
 Doesburgedessa Fernandes, 2010
 Edessa (bug) Fabricius, 1803
 Grammedessa Correia & Fernandes, 2016
 Lopadusa Stål, 1860
 Mediocampus Thomas, 1994
 Neopharnus Van Duzee, 1910
 Olbia (bug) Stål, 1862
 Pantochlora Stål, 1870
 Paraedessa Silva & Fernandes, 2013
 Peromatus Amyot & Serville, 1843
 Pharnus Stål, 1867
 Plagaedessa Almeida & Fernandes, 2018
 Platistocoris Rider, 1998
 Praepharnus Barber & Bruner, 1932

Pentatominae Leach, 1815
 Bathycoelia Amyot & Serville, 1843
 Pentatoma Olivier, 1789
Phyllocephalinae Amyot & Serville, 1843
 Cressona Dallas, 1851
 Megarrhamphus Bergroth, 1891
 Phyllocephala Laporte, 1833
 Tetroda Amyot & Serville, 1843
Podopinae Amyot & Serville, 1843
 Graphosoma Laporte de Castelnau, 1833
 Podops Laporte de Castelnau, 1833
Serbaninae (monotypic)
 Serbana borneensis Distant, 1906
Stirotarsinae (monotypic)
 Stirotarsus Bergroth, 1911
incertae sedis
 Antillosciocoris Thomas, 2005
 Asopus Burmeister, 1834
 Jostenicoris Arnold, 2011

Description
All pentatomids have 5-segmented antennae, and 3 tarsal segments on each foot. They generally have a large triangular scutellum in the center of the back. The body shape of adult pentatomids is generally "shieldlike," when viewed from above, but this varies between species, and is not true for the immature nymphal stages. The forewings of stink bugs are called hemelytra, with the basal half thickened while the apex is membranous. At rest, the wings are laid across the back of the insect, with the membranous wingtips overlapping. The hindwings are entirely membranous.

Economics

Several stink bugs and shield bugs are considered agricultural pests, because they can grow into large populations that feed on crops, damaging production, and they are resistant to many pesticides. They are a threat to cotton, corn, sorghum, soybeans, native and ornamental trees, shrubs, vines, weeds, and many cultivated crops.

In Mexico, some species of stink bugs are called jumil, chinche de monte, xotlinilli, or chumil (e.g. Edessa mexicana). They are most often eaten in the states of Morelos and Guerrero. The flavor is sometimes said to resemble cinnamon, or sometimes a bitter medicinal flavor. Jumiles may be used for making sauces or as taco filling.

Since recent arrival in the U.S., populations of the brown marmorated stink bug have grown significantly. As of October 2014, brown marmorated stink bugs can be found in 41 out of 50 states within the U.S. In 2016 New Zealand's MPI put out an alert to prevent this invasive species from entering via imported cargo.

See also
 List of Pentatomidae genera
Chinavia hilaris, the green stink bug
Alcaeorrhynchus grandis
Cosmopepla lintneriana, the twice-stabbed stink bug
Halyomorpha halys, the brown marmorated stink bug
Oebalus pugnax, the rice stink bug
Euthyrhynchus floridanus, the Florida predatory stink bug

European species 
European species within this family include:

 Acrosternum arabicum Wagner, 1959
 Acrosternum heegeri Fieber, 1861
 Acrosternum malickyi Josifov & Heiss, 1989
 Acrosternum millierei (Mulsant & Rey, 1866)
 Acrosternum rubescens (Noualhier, 1893)
 Aelia acuminata  (Linnaeus, 1758)
 Aelia albovittata Fieber, 1868
 Aelia angusta Stehlik, 1976
 Aelia cognata Fieber, 1868
 Aelia cribrosa Fieber, 1868
 Aelia furcula Fieber, 1868
 Aelia germari Kuster, 1852
 Aelia klugii Hahn, 1833
 Aelia notata Rey, 1887
 Aelia rostrata Boheman, 1852
 Aelia sibirica Reuter, 1884
 Aelia virgata (Herrich-Schäffer, 1841)
 Ancyrosoma leucogrammes (Gmelin, 1790)
 Andrallus spinidens (Fabricius, 1787)
 Antheminia absinthii (Wagner, 1952)
 Antheminia aliena (Reuter, 1891)
 Antheminia lunulata (Goeze, 1778)
 Antheminia pusio (Kolenati, 1846)
 Antheminia varicornis (Jakovlev, 1874)
 Apodiphus amygdali (Germar, 1817)
 Arma custos (Fabricius, 1794)
 Arma insperata Horvath, 1899
 Asaroticus solskyi Jakovlev, 1873
 Bagrada abeillei Puton, 1881
 Bagrada confusa Horvath, 1936
 Bagrada elegans Puton, 1873
 Bagrada funerea Horvath, 1901
 Bagrada hilaris (Burmeister, 1835)
 Bagrada stolida (Herrich-Schäffer, 1839)
 Bagrada turcica Horvath, 1936
 Brachynema cinctum (Fabricius, 1775)
 Brachynema germarii (Kolenati, 1846)
 Brachynema purpureomarginatum (Rambur, 1839)
 Capnoda batesoni Jakovlev, 1889
 Carpocoris coreanus Distant, 1899
 Carpocoris fuscispinus (Boheman, 1850)
 Carpocoris melanocerus (Mulsant & Rey, 1852)
 Carpocoris pudicus (Poda, 1761)
 Carpocoris purpureipennis (De Geer, 1773)
 Chlorochroa juniperina (Linnaeus, 1758)
 Chlorochroa pinicola (Mulsant & Rey, 1852)
 Chlorochroa reuteriana (Kirkaldy, 1909)
 Chroantha ornatula (Herrich-Schäffer, 1842)
 Codophila varia (Fabricius, 1787)
 Crypsinus angustatus (Baerensprung, 1859)
 Derula flavoguttata Mulsant & Rey, 1856
 Dolycoris baccarum (Linnaeus, 1758)
 Dolycoris numidicus Horvath, 1908
 Dryadocoris apicalis (Herrich-Schäffer, 1842)
 Dybowskyia reticulata (Dallas, 1851)
 Dyroderes umbraculatus (Fabricius, 1775)
 Eudolycoris alluaudi (Noualhier, 1893)
 Eurydema cyanea (Fieber, 1864)
 Eurydema dominulus (Scopoli, 1763)
 Eurydema eckerleini Josifov, 1961
 Eurydema fieberi Schummel, 1837
 Eurydema gebleri Kolenati, 1846
 Eurydema herbacea (Herrich-Schäffer, 1833)
 Eurydema lundbaldi Lindberg, 1960
 Eurydema maracandica Oshanin, 1871
 Eurydema nana Fuente, 1971
 Eurydema oleracea (Linnaeus, 1758)
 Eurydema ornata (Linnaeus, 1758)
 Eurydema rotundicollis (Dohrn, 1860)
 Eurydema rugulosa (Dohrn, 1860)
 Eurydema sea Pericart & De la Rosa 2004
 Eurydema spectabilis Horvath, 1882
 Eurydema ventralis Kolenati, 1846
 Eysarcoris aeneus (Scopoli, 1763)
 Eysarcoris ventralis (Westwood, 1837)
 Eysarcoris venustissimus (Schrank, 1776)
 Graphosoma interruptum White, 1839
 Graphosoma italicum (Müller, 1766)
 Graphosoma lineatum (Linnaeus, 1758)
 Graphosoma melanoxanthum Horvath, 1903
 Graphosoma semipunctatum (Fabricius, 1775)
 Halyomorpha halys (Stål, 1855)
 Holcogaster fibulata (Germar, 1831)
 Holcostethus albipes (Fabricius, 1781)
 Holcostethus evae Ribes, 1988
 Holcostethus sphacelatus (Fabricius, 1794)
 Jalla dumosa (Linnaeus, 1758)
 Leprosoma inconspicuum Baerensprung, 1859
 Leprosoma stali Douglas & Scott, 1868
 Leprosoma tuberculatum Jakovlev, 1874
 Macrorhaphis acuta Dallas, 1851
 Mecidea lindbergi Wagner, 1954
 Mecidea pallidissima Jensen-Haarup, 1922
 Menaccarus arenicola (Scholz, 1847)
 Menaccarus deserticola Jakovlev, 1900
 Menaccarus dohrnianus (Mulsant & Rey, 1866)
 Menaccarus turolensis Fuente, 1971
 Mustha spinosula (Lefèbvre, 1831)
 Neostrachia bisignata (Walker, 1867)
 Neottiglossa bifida (A. Costa, 1847)
 Neottiglossa flavomarginata (Lucas, 1849)
 Neottiglossa leporina (Herrich-Schäffer, 1830)
 Neottiglossa lineolata (Mulsant & Rey, 1852)
 Neottiglossa pusilla (Gmelin, 1790)
 Nezara viridula (Linnaeus, 1758)
 Palomena formosa Vidal, 1940
 Palomena prasina (Linnaeus, 1761)
 Palomena viridissima (Poda, 1761)
 Pentatoma rufipes (Linnaeus, 1758)
 Peribalus congenitus Putshkov, 1965
 Peribalus inclusus (Dohrn, 1860)
 Peribalus strictus (Fabricius, 1803)
 Perillus bioculatus (Fabricius, 1775)
 Picromerus bidens (Linnaeus, 1758)
 Picromerus brachypterus Ahmad & Onder, 1990
 Picromerus conformis (Herrich-Schäffer, 1841)
 Picromerus nigridens (Fabricius, 1803)
 Piezodorus lituratus (Fabricius, 1794)
 Piezodorus punctipes Puton, 1889
 Piezodorus teretipes (Stål, 1865)
 Pinthaeus sanguinipes (Fabricius, 1781)
 Podops annulicornis Jakovlev, 1877
 Podops calligerus Horvath, 1887
 Podops curvidens Costa, 1843
 Podops dilatatus Puton, 1873
 Podops inunctus (Fabricius, 1775)
 Podops rectidens Horvath, 1883
 Putonia torrida Stål, 1872
 Rhacognathus punctatus (Linnaeus, 1758)
 Rhaphigaster nebulosa (Poda, 1761)
 Rubiconia intermedia (Wolff, 1811)
 Schyzops aegyptiaca (Lefèbvre, 1831)
 Sciocoris angularis Puton, 1889
 Sciocoris angusticollis Puton, 1895
 Sciocoris conspurcatus Klug, 1845
 Sciocoris convexiusculus Puton, 1874
 Sciocoris cursitans (Fabricius, 1794)
 Sciocoris deltocephalus Fieber, 1861
 Sciocoris distinctus Fieber, 1851
 Sciocoris galiberti Ribaut, 1926
 Sciocoris helferi Fieber, 1851
 Sciocoris hoberlandti Wagner, 1954
 Sciocoris homalonotus Fieber, 1851
 Sciocoris luteolus Fieber, 1861
 Sciocoris macrocephalus Fieber, 1851
 Sciocoris maculatus Fieber, 1851
 Sciocoris microphthalmus Flor, 1860
 Sciocoris modestus Horvath, 1903
 Sciocoris ochraceus Fieber, 1861
 Sciocoris orientalis Linnavuori, 1960
 Sciocoris pallens Klug, 1845
 Sciocoris pentheri Wagner, 1953
 Sciocoris pictus Wagner, 1959
 Sciocoris sideritidis Wollaston, 1858
 Sciocoris sulcatus Fieber, 1851
 Sciocoris umbrinus (Wolff, 1804)
 Sciocoriscanariensis Lindberg, 1953
 Scotinophara sicula (A. Costa, 1841)
 Scotinophara subalpina (Bergroth, 1893)
 Stagonomus amoenus (Brullé, 1832)
 Stagonomus bipunctatus (Linnaeus, 1758)
 Stagonomus devius Seidenstucker, 1965
 Stagonomus grenieri (Signoret, 1865)
 Staria lunata (Hahn, 1835)
 Stenozygum coloratum (Klug, 1845)
 Sternodontus binodulus Jakovlev, 1893
 Sternodontus obtusus Mulsant & Rey, 1856
 Tarisa dimidiatipes Puton, 1874
 Tarisa elevata Reuter, 1901
 Tarisa flavescens Amyot & Serville, 1843
 Tarisa pallescens Jakovlev, 1871
 Tarisa salsolae Kerzhner, 1964
 Tarisa subspinosa (Germar, 1839)
 Tholagmus flavolineatus (Fabricius, 1798)
 Tholagmus strigatus (Herrich-Schäffer, 1835)
 Trochiscocoris hemipterus (Jakovlev, 1879)
 Trochiscocoris rotundatus Horvath, 1895
 Troilus luridus (Fabricius, 1775)
 Ventocoris achivus (Horvath, 1889)
 Ventocoris falcatus (Cyrillus, 1791)
 Ventocoris fischeri (Herrich-Schäffer, 1851)
 Ventocoris halophilum (Jakovlev, 1874)
 Ventocoris modestus (Jakovlev, 1880)
 Ventocoris philalyssum (Kiritshenko, 1916)
 Ventocoris ramburi (Horvath, 1908)
 Ventocoris rusticus (Fabricius, 1781)
 Ventocoris trigonus (Krynicki, 1871)
 Vilpianus galii (Wolff, 1802)
 Zicrona caerulea (Linnaeus, 1758)

References

External links

When Twenty-Six Thousand Stinkbugs Invade Your Home by Kathryn Schulz. The New Yorker, March 12, 2018. Ed Yong called it a "pure delight."
I.A.D. Robertson: The Pentatomoidea (Hemiptera: Heteroptera) of Sub-Saharan Africa : a database. Malindi, 2009
Shieldbugs of Britain
Stink Bugs of North America – photos and information
Images of shield bugs
 I. A. D. Robertson: The Pentatomoidea (Hemiptera: Heteroptera) of Sub-Saharan Africa : a database. Malindi, 2009. Online version in Repository Naturalis Leiden

 
Heteroptera families
Shield bugs
Taxa named by William Elford Leach

la:Cimex foetidus